This is a list of missiologists having Wikipedia articles.

Johan Herman Bavinck
David Bosch
Carl Braaten
Harvie M. Conn
Benjamin L. Corey
Duncan B. Forrester
Michael Frost (minister)
Arthur Glasser
Darrell Guder
Roger E. Hedlund
Paul Hiebert (missiologist)
Alan Hirsch
Hendrik Kraemer
Charles H. Kraft
Donald McGavran
Gary V. Nelson
Lesslie Newbigin
Eugene Nida
Tony Palmer (bishop)
Lamin Sanneh
James Augustin Brown Scherer
Ed Stetzer
Theo Sundermeier
Bengt Sundkler
Alan Tippett
C. Peter Wagner
Gustav Warneck
Andrew Walls
Ralph D. Winter
Thomas Schirrmacher
Henning Wrogemann

Christian missions
Practical theology